A. J. Verdelle (born 1960 in Washington, D.C.), is an American novelist who is published by Algonquin Books and Harper, with essays published by Crown, the Smithsonian, the Whitney Museum, Random House, and University of Georgia Press. Verdelle has forthcoming novels from Random House imprint Spiegel & Grau.

Life
A. J. Verdelle is the daughter of A. Y. and Patricia Howell Jones, both of whom were native Washingtonians. On her father's side, Verdelle is a fourth-generation Washingtonian, a descendant of the sequestered and little studied freedmen's community of free people of color that flourished in the 19th century after the end of  slavery and reconstruction in the nation's capital.

Verdelle attended La Reine, a private Catholic girls' high school in Suitland, Maryland, a Prince George's County suburb of Washington, D.C. She graduated from college in 1982 from the University of Chicago with a B.A. in political science, earning an M.A. in Applied Statistics there in 1986. She earned an MFA in creative writing from Bard College, in the Hudson Valley of New York, in 1993.

After receiving her M.A. in statistics, Verdelle moved to Brooklyn, New York, and founded a statistics consulting firm in 1988.

Verdelle's prize-winning first novel, The Good Negress, was published to considerable acclaim in 1995. It was released in paperback in 1996. Nobel laureate Toni Morrison called the novel "truly extraordinary." Verdelle has taught Creative Writing at Princeton University, and Vermont College; she teaches in the MFA program at Lesley University.

In 2010, Verdelle was featured in a documentary, Cheating the Stillness, chronicling the life of Julia Peterkin, who in 1929 was the first American woman to be awarded the Pulitzer Prize.  Peterkin wrote several novels about black life in the plantation South. Peterkin's perspectives were searingly intimate, and some readers thought that she must be African American. Verdelle had studied Peterkin's oeuvre, and featured her novel Scarlet Sister Mary in the narrative interior of The Good Negress.

Awards
 Finalist, Los Angeles Times Book Prize
 Finalist, PEN/Faulkner Award
 Vursell Award, American Academy of Arts and Letters
 1996 Whiting Award

Works

Criticism

References

External links
Profile at The Whiting Foundation

"HEMINGWAY AT 100", News Hour, PBS, July 21, 1999

1960 births
Living people
20th-century American novelists
21st-century American novelists
African-American novelists
American women novelists
Bard College alumni
Lesley University faculty
Princeton University faculty
University of Chicago alumni
Vermont College of Fine Arts faculty
Novelists from Washington, D.C.
20th-century American women writers
21st-century American women writers
American women essayists
PEN/Faulkner Award for Fiction winners
Novelists from New Jersey
Novelists from Massachusetts
Novelists from Vermont
20th-century American essayists
21st-century American essayists
American women academics
20th-century African-American women writers
20th-century African-American writers
21st-century African-American women writers
21st-century African-American writers